Naci Taşdöğen (born 3 March 1963 in Istanbul) is a Turkish actor.

He performed in the Emret Komutanım and O Şimdi Asker series.

Filmography

Films

 Ağır Roman : 1997
 Mektup : 1997
 Üçüncü Sayfa : 1998
 Asansör : 1998
 Gemide : 1999
 Sahne : 2006
 Emret Komutanım Şah Mat : 2010
 Çakal : 2010
 Şenlikname Bir İstanbul Masalı : 2010
 Van Gölü Canavarı : 2012
 Eyyvah Eyvah 3: 2014

TV series
 Süper Baba : 1993
 Çiçek Taksi : 1995
 Vaka-i Zaptiye : 2002
 Lise Defteri : 2003
 Emret Komutanım : 2005-2008
 Emret Komutanım Yeniden : 2013

References 

1967 births
Living people
Turkish male film actors